Stanley Township may refer to:

Canada 

Stanley Township, a historic township in Huron County, Ontario

United States 

Stanley Township, Arkansas County, Arkansas
Stanley Township, Lyon County, Minnesota
Stanley Township, Cass County, North Dakota

See also 

Stanley (disambiguation)

Township name disambiguation pages